Wynona Records is an Italian record company which only produces pop punk albums.

Notable artists
 Digger
 Duff
 Manges
 Melody Fall
 The Travoltas
 Vanilla Sky
 New Hope
 If I Die Today
 Hopes Die Last
 Cry Excess
 Halfway Home

External links
Wynona Records MySpace

Italian record labels